Highgate is a suburban area of north London, spanning the boroughs of Haringey, Camden and Islington.

Highgate or High Gate may also refer to:

Australia
Highgate, South Australia, a suburb of Adelaide
Highgate, Western Australia, a suburb in Perth
Highgate Hill, Queensland, a suburb in Brisbane

Jamaica
Highgate, Jamaica, a market town

South Africa
Highgate Village, a village (section) of Dainfern, Johannesburg

United Kingdom
Highgate (Camden ward), London
Highgate (Haringey ward), London

Highgate, Birmingham, an area to the south of Birmingham city centre, England
Highgate, Hawkhurst, Kent, England
Highgate, South Yorkshire, a local name for an area to the west of Goldthorpe, near Barnsley
Highgate tube station, a London Underground station on the Northern Line, in Haringey
Highgate, Walsall, situated 10 miles north of Birmingham, England

United States
High Gate, Missouri
Highgate, Vermont
High Gate, a historic house in West Virginia

See also
Highgate Park, a park in Highgate, Birmingham
Highgate Park, the final name of the former Julia Farr Centre in Adelaide, South Australia 
Highgate School, an independent school in Highgate, London, England